Batrachedra amydraula, the lesser date moth, is a species of moth of the family Batrachedridae found from Bangladesh to western Saudi Arabia, Yemen, Israel, Iraq, and Iran, as well as most of North Africa.

The wingspan is 10–14 mm.

The larvae feed on Derris trifoliata and Phoenix dactylifera. It is one of the most important pests on date palm that may cause more than 50% loss of the crop. There are three generations per year in the United Arab Emirates. The first larvae appear in April and damage newly formed fruits. They are dormant from August to March of the following year, resting between the bases of the terminal fronds. Pupation takes place in March and adults emerge in April.

References

Batrachedridae
Moths described in 1916